Zandvlei Estuary Nature Reserve (also spelt "Sandvlei") is a  nature reserve and recreational area located in Muizenberg near Cape Town, South Africa.

Background
Entering the ocean in the coastal town of Muizenberg, Zandvlei is the only functioning estuary on Cape Town’s False Bay coast, open to the Atlantic Ocean throughout winter and in summer the mouth is manually closed by a sand bar to contain the water, and is opened monthly for a few days at full moon to maintain salinity levels and then closed again. It is also one of the most important estuaries for recruitment of fish such as garrick, steenbras and two species of stumpnose.

The surrounding wetland is an important habitat for birds and has 166 species on its official list. There are a number of bird hides available to the public. It is also a vital habitat for amphibians and about 20 species of reptile such as the angulate tortoise, marsh terrapin and mole snake. Porcupines, grysbok, otters and mongoose can also occasionally be spotted.

The plant life is typical of Cape Flats Dune Strandveld and Cape Wetland vegetation. Rare or interesting plants include Gladiolus angustus and Salvia africana-lutea.

The estuary was neglected in the past, and suffered from farming, urban development, dredging and the introduction of alien invasive species. The original vegetation has been partly restored through local government and volunteer efforts.
There is now an Environmental Education Centre and the reserve is home to the Imperial Yacht Club and Peninsula Canoe Club. SCOUTS South Africa operate their Sea Scout base from there,  conducting sailing and rowing regattas there, in addition to various training courses and the annual Kon-Tiki raft building competition. Fishing is popular, with many large garrick having been landed. A standard fishing permit is required.

Gallery

See also
 Biodiversity of Cape Town
 List of nature reserves in Cape Town
 Cape Flats Dune Strandveld
 Cape Lowland Freshwater Wetland
 SCOUTS South Africa
 Kon-Tiki (Scouting)

References

Nature reserves in Cape Town
Protected areas of the Western Cape
Wetlands of South Africa